Freda Bedi (born Freda Marie Houlston; 5 February 1911 – 26 March 1977), also known as Sister Palmo or Gelongma Karma Kechog Palmo, was a British woman who was jailed in India as a supporter of Indian nationalism and was the first Western woman to take full ordination in Tibetan Buddhism.

Early life 

Freda Marie Houlston was born in a flat above her father's jewellery and watch repair business in Monk Street in Derby. When she was still a baby, the family moved to Littleover, a suburb of Derby.

Freda's father served in the First World War and was enrolled in the Machine Guns Corps. He was killed in northern France on 14 April 1918. Her mother, Nellie, remarried in 1920, to Frank Norman Swan. Freda studied at Hargrave House and then at Parkfields Cedars School, both in Derby. She also spent several months studying at a school in Rheims in northern France. She succeeded in gaining admission to St Hugh's College, Oxford to study French, being awarded an Exhibition or minor scholarship.

Life at Oxford 
At Oxford, Freda Houlston changed her subject from French to Philosophy, Politics and Economics (PPE). She met her husband Baba Pyare Lal "BPL" Bedi, an Indian from Lahore, on her PPE course. He was a Sikh from the Bedi family, linked to a Sikh clan tracing back to Guru Nanak Dev Ji. Romance blossomed and they married at Oxford Registry Office in June 1933, in spite of the reservations of her family and disciplinary action by her college.

Whilst at Oxford Freda became involved in politics. She attended meetings of the Oxford Majlis, where nationalist-minded Indian students gathered, as well as of the communist October Club and the Labour Club. This was another bond with BPL Bedi, who became a keen communist and opponent of Empire. The couple together edited four books on India's struggle for Independence. At St Hugh's her closest friends included Barbara Castle, later a prominent Labour cabinet minister, and the broadcaster Olive Shapley. All three women graduated with a third-class degree; Freda's husband got a fourth-class degree.

Life in India 
After a year in Berlin where B.P.L. Bedi was studying - and where their first child, Ranga,  was born - Freda, her husband and baby son sailed to India in 1934. She worked as a journalist and taught English at a women's college in Lahore, and with her husband published a high quality quarterly review "Contemporary India". They also later published a weekly political paper, "Monday Morning".  Freda regularly contributed articles to Lahore's main nationalist daily, The Tribune. Both she and her husband were leftists and campaigning nationalists active in India's independence movement.  The couple's second child, Tilak, died when less than a year old. The family lived in an encampment of huts, without power or running water, outside Model Town in Lahore.

"Baba" Bedi spent about fifteen months in an internment camp at Deoli in the early stages of World War Two because as a communist he was seeking to disrupt recruitment of Punjabis into the British Indian army. Freda herself was jailed for three months in 1941 as a satyagrahi after deliberately defying the wartime regulations as part of a civil disobedience campaign spearheaded by Mohandas K. Gandhi After independence in 1947, Bedi and her family moved to Kashmir, where husband and wife were influential supporters of Sheikh Abdullah, the left-wing Kashmiri nationalist leader. She joined a  women's militia for a while and taught English at a newly established women's college in Srinagar in Kashmir. Later in Delhi, she became editor of the magazine "Social Welfare" of the Ministry of Welfare.

Freda Bedi briefly served as a member of the United Nations Social Services Planning Commission to Burma, during which she was first exposed to Buddhism, which quickly became the defining aspect of her life. In Rangoon she learned vipassana from Mahasi Sayadaw, and Sayadaw U Titthila.
 In Delhi, she became a prominent Buddhist and in 1956, when the 14th Dalai Lama made his first visit to India, she showed him around Buddhist shrines in Delhi.

In 1959, when the Dalai Lama arrived in India after an arduous trek across the Himalayas followed by thousands of his Tibetan devotees, she was asked by India's prime minister Jawaharlal Nehru to help them and spent time improving facilities for refugees at camps in Assam and West Bengal. She became an observant Tibetan Buddhist and she followed the guidance of the 16th Karmapa of the Kagyu School. She worked, with the support of the Dalai Lama, to establish the Young Lamas Home School. Bedi initially set up the Young Lama's School in Delhi but after a short period it was moved to Dalhousie. The school trained young Tibetan lamas and monks in languages and social sciences as well as religion, to equip the coming generation of Tibetan spiritual leaders for life in exile. A number of Bedi's pupils became well-known teachers, including Chogyam Trungpa, Thubten Zopa Rinpoche, Akong Rinpoche, Tulku Pema Tenzin, Gelek Rimpoche, Lama Yeshe Losal Rinpoche, and the sons of Tulku Urgyen Rinpoche, Chokyi Nyima and Chokling of Tsikey). In 1963, with Lama Karma Thinley Rinpoche and under the guidance of the Karmapa, she founded the Karma Drubgyu Thargay Ling nunnery for Tibetan women, now located in Tilokpur, Kangra Valley.

While running the Young Lamas Home School at Dalhousie in north India, Bedi also spent time at Rumtek in Sikkim, the seat of the Karmapa in exile. In 1966, she took sramaneri ordination by the Karmapa and was given the name Karma Kechog Palmo. She was one of the first Western women to take ordination in Tibetan Buddhism. In 1972, she took full bhikshuni ordination in Hong Kong - the first western woman to do so, and according to the scholar Hanna Havnevik possibly the first woman in the Tibetan tradition ever to receive this higher ordination. She accompanied the Karmapa on his first visit to the West in 1974, a landmark five-month tour across North America and Europe. Although not fluent in Tibetan, she helped to translate prayers and religious texts into English. She is credited for bringing Tibetian Buddhism to the West.

Bedi died in New Delhi on 26 March 1977. She was survived by two sons, Ranga Bedi, who was a tea planter, and Kabir Bedi, a Hollywood and Bollywood film and TV star, who was born in Lahore in 1946; a daughter, Gulhima, who was born in Srinagar in 1949, now lives in the United States. A hand crafted wooden tribute to Freda Bedi, made by Kalwinder Singh Dhindsa, was placed in a community garden in her home city of Derby in June 2022.

Published works 
 Freda Marie Houlston Bedi, Baba Pyare Lal Bedi, (editors) India analysed, three volumes published by Victor Gollancz, 1933-4
 Freda Marie Houlston Bedi, Behind the Mud Walls, Lahore: Unity Publishers, 1943
 Freda Bedi, Bengal Lamenting, Lahore: Lion, 1944
 Baba Pyare Lal Bedi, Freda Marie (Houlston) Bedi, Sheikh Abdullah: his life and ideals, pamphlet, c1949
 Ein Rosenkranz von Morgengebeten : nach der Tradition des Mahayana – Buddhismus / aus dem Tibetischen ins Englische übers. von Karma Khechog Palmo. Deutsche Wiedergabe von Advayavajra. – Almora, Indien : Kasar-Devi-Ashram-Publication, 1971. – VI, 49 S.
 Freda Bedi, Anna Bhushan (illustrator), Rhymes for Ranga, Random House, India, 2010,

Translations

From French 
 Voltaire, Fragments on India, Lion Press, 1937

From Tibetan 
 A Garland of morning prayers in the tradition of Mahayana Buddhism, Gelongma Karma Tsultim Khechog Palmo, Ed Palmo, 1976
 Wangchuk Dorje (Karmapa IX), Mahamudra meditation or The Mahamudra, Gelongma Karma Tsultim Khechog Palmo, Ed. Karma Rigdol Publications, 1971

Further reading 
 The Lives of Freda: the political, spiritual and personal journeys of Freda Bedi (2019) by Andrew Whitehead, Speaking Tiger 
 The Spiritual Odyssey of Freda Bedi: England, India, Burma, Sikkim and Beyond (2018) by Norma Levine
 The Revolutionary Life of Freda Bedi: British Feminist, Indian Nationalist, Buddhist Nun (2017) by Vicki Mackenzie. Shambhala, 
 Cave in the Snow: a Western woman's quest for enlightenment (1999)  by Vicki Mackenzie. . (A biography of Tenzin Palmo, also about Freda Bedi)
 A brief account of Freda Bedi's life and career published in Oxford Today in 2017
 The Making of a Buddhist Nun
 A newspaper feature about Freda Bedi's political involvement in Kashmir
 Freda Bedi, the British woman who fought for India's freedom - BBC website article
 Freda Bedi's 1940s journalism about Kashmir

References
 

 Sheila Meiring Fugard "Lady of Realisation.  1st ed.  Cape Town: Maitri Publications, 1984.  Copyright © The Library of Congress, No. Txu 140-945.  Cape Town: Electronic Ed., luxlapis.tripod.com.  19 April 1999.  Accessed 30 September 2008.  (In 3 parts.) [A "spiritual biography" of Buddhist Sister Palmo.]

External links 
 Website devoted to the life of Freda Bedi and her political, spiritual and personal journeys
 In Memory of The Venerable Gelongma Karma Kechog Palmo
  Photographs of Freda Bedi from Kashmir in the 1940s
  Freda Bedi's 'Bengal Lamenting', with its striking cover designed by Sobha Singh
 Cherry Armstrong's ebook 'Tibetan Tapestry' about working with Freda Bedi and her tulku pupils in India in the early 1960s 
 Freda Bedi in her own voice talking about her time as a student at Oxford

1911 births
People from Derby
British social workers
Tibetan Buddhist nuns
Gandhians
1977 deaths
Alumni of St Hugh's College, Oxford
British Buddhist nuns
Tibetan Buddhists from England
Kagyu Buddhists
Converts to Buddhism
Buddhist nuns
Tibetan–English translators
French–English translators
20th-century British women writers
20th-century British writers
20th-century translators
English emigrants to India
20th-century Buddhist nuns